Bolivia hosted the Copa América for the second time in its 38th edition. It was held from 11 to 29 June. It was organized by CONMEBOL, South America's football governing body.

There is no qualifying for the final tournament. All South American countries (10 countries) participate, along with two more invited countries, making a total of 12 teams competing in the tournament.

In the 1997 edition, Costa Rica and Mexico were the invitees.

The tournament was won by Brazil, who became the first team to hold the Copa América and the World Cup at the same time, a feat they would repeat in 2004.

Venues

Squads
For a complete list of participating squads: 1997 Copa América squads

Match officials

 Argentina
 Horacio Elizondo

 Bolivia
 René Ortubé
 Juan Carlos Paniagua

 Brazil
 Antônio Pereira

 Chile
 Eduardo Gamboa

 Colombia
 Rafael Sanabria

 Costa Rica
 Rodrigo Badilla

 Ecuador
 Byron Moreno

 Mexico
 Antonio Marrufo

 Paraguay
 Epifanio González

 Peru
 José Arana

 Uruguay
 Jorge Nieves

 United States
 Esfandiar Baharmast

 Venezuela
 Paolo Borgosano

Group stage
The teams were divided into three groups of four teams each. The formation of the groups was made by CONMEBOL, in a public drawing of lots that took place on 17 December 1996.

Each team plays one match against each of the other teams within the same group. Three points are awarded for a win, one point for a draw and zero points for a defeat.

First and second placed teams, in each group, advance to the quarter-finals.
The best third placed team and the second best third placed team, also advance to the quarter-finals.

 Tie-breaker
 If teams finish leveled on points, the following tie-breakers are used:
 greater goal difference in all group games;
 greater number of goals scored in all group games;
 winner of the head-to-head match between the teams in question;
 drawing of lots.

Group A

Group B

Group C

Ranking of third-placed teams
At the end of the first stage, a comparison was made between the third-placed teams of each group. The two best third-placed teams advanced to the quarter-finals.

Knockout stage

Quarter-finals

Semi-finals

Third-place match

Final

Result

Goalscorers
With six goals, Luis Hernández is the top scorer in the tournament. In total, 67 goals were scored by 42 different players, with two of them credited as own goals.

6 goals
  Luis Hernández

5 goals
  Ronaldo

3 Goals

  Marcelo Gallardo
  Erwin Sánchez
  Leonardo
  Romário

2 goals

  Julio César Baldivieso
  Marco Etcheverry
  Djalminha
  Edmundo
  Neider Morantes
  Ariel Graziani
  Paul Cominges
  Martín Hidalgo

1 goal

  Sergio Berti
  Milton Coimbra
  Jaime Moreno
  Ramiro Castillo
  Aldair
  Denílson
  Dunga
  Flávio Conceição
  Zé Roberto
  Fernando Vergara
  Víctor Aristizábal
  Wilmer Cabrera
  Hernán Gaviria
  Hámilton Ricard
  Hernán Medford
  Mauricio Wright
  Luis Capurro
  José Gavica
  Wellington Sánchez
  Cuauhtémoc Blanco
  Nicolás Ramírez
  Roberto Acuña
  José Luis Chilavert
  Eddy Carazas
  Álvaro Recoba
  Marcelo Saralegui

Own goals
  Rónald González (for Brazil)
  Camilo Romero (for Brazil)

Final positions

References

External links

 1997 Copa América at RSSSF

 
Copa América tournaments
Copa America, 1997
Copa America
Copa America
Copa America
Sports competitions in Sucre
Copa America, 1997
Sport in Cochabamba
Sports competitions in La Paz
20th century in La Paz
Oruro Department
Sports competitions in Santa Cruz de la Sierra
History of Santa Cruz de la Sierra